Gnaeus Cornelius Scipio Asina (lived 3rd century BC) was a Roman general and statesman involved in the First Punic War.

Scipio Asina belonged to the patrician family of the Cornelii Scipiones. He was son of Lucius Cornelius Scipio Barbatus and brother of Lucius Cornelius Scipio (consul 259 BC). His son was Publius Cornelius Scipio Asina, consul in 221 BC.
Elected consul for the year 260 BC, Scipio Asina had the honour of commanding the first Roman fleet launched onto the Mediterranean Sea.

While patrolling the waters of the Messina strait between Italy and Sicily, Scipio Asina received the information that Lipara, in the Lipari Islands, was about to change to the Roman side. Eager to secure such an important port and to gain glory for himself, he rushed to the islands without considering security. It is unclear if the Carthaginians planned the whole affair, but the Roman fleet was trapped in the harbor by Hannibal Gisco. Without naval warfare experience, the crews panicked and escaped to land, leaving the ships unattended and Scipio Asina to be made prisoner by the Carthaginians. Although there was hardly any fighting, the encounter is known as the Battle of the Lipari Islands.

His mishap earned him the pejorative surname Asina ("ass", literally "female donkey", in Latin), given by political opponents. Neither the humiliation, nor his loss, ended his career; in 254 BC, Scipio Asina was elected consul for the second time and, with his co-consul Aulus Atilius Caiatinus, succeeded in the conquest of Panormus (Palermo, now capital of Sicily).

See also
 Scipio-Paullus-Gracchus family tree

References

3rd-century BC Roman consuls
Asina, Gnaeus
Roman commanders of the First Punic War
Roman patricians
Year of birth unknown
Year of death unknown